Zai Jian Wo Men De Shi Nian is a 2015 Chinese romantic comedy film directed by Sun Hao. It was released in China on June 12, 2015.

Cast
Guo Jiaming
Liu Yun
Mike Sui
Pan Shuangshuang
Miki Yeung
Li Yanan
Wang Xiaokun
Denny Huang

Reception
By June 13, the film had earned  at the Chinese box office.

References

Chinese romantic comedy films
2015 romantic comedy films
2010s Mandarin-language films